Hadspen Quarry is a stone quarry in Somerset, England. It is shown on Ordnance Survey maps for 1888–90, and may have been in operation for a considerable period before that.

It supplies natural stone walling throughout the West Country.  The products include coursed, coursed random and random rubble walling. The stone is still split and dressed at the quarry located close to Hadspen house and garden in the small village of Hadspen, within the parish of Pitcombe just outside Castle Cary.

This golden colour limestone is seen in buildings in western Dorset and the surrounding areas, as can be seen at the Fleet Street site in Beaminster. Other products include name plaques, sawn ashlar quoins and capping stones.  The stone is an Inferior Oolite of the Garantiana Beds, dating back to the Middle Jurassic.

References

External links
 Hadspen quarry
 Ordnance Survey 1:10560 County Series 1st edition (c.1884-87) Sheet 65 Subsheet 09 (showing the quarry top right)

Quarries in Somerset
Middle Jurassic Europe
Jurassic England